Mathieu Khedimi (born on 19 February 1964) is a French rugby league coach and former player. He played as hooker or lock forward. He played his entire career for AS Saint-Estève with which he won several titles. An author of the rugby league literature considered him as "the soul of the club since long times".

Biography
Khedimi was formed in rugby union in the ranks of USA Perpignan, reaching the Reichel Championship semi-final in 1982, under the guidance of the coach Louis Cros.

In rugby league, he was part of the great Saint-Estève team, collecting the titles of the French Championship and Lord Derby Cup in the 80s and the 90s.

Career
Finally, he earned 9 caps for France between 1987 and 1994, taking part at the 1985-1988, 1989-1992 and 1995 World Cups. He was also the coach of AS Saint-Estève in 1998, with a French Championship and Lord Derby Cup title. 
Currently, Khedimi is the French Rugby League Federation vice-president, along with Marc Palanques.

Personal life
He is father of the rugby league players Matthieu Khedimi and Romain Khedimi, the former being a French international.

In his civil life, he owns an earthworks company, after being a municipal police officer.

Honours

Player 
 Team Honours :
 Winner of the  French Championship : 1989, 1990, 1993 and 1997 (Saint-Estève).
 Winner of the Lord Derby Cup : 1987, 1993, 1994 and 1995 (Saint-Estève).
Runner-up at the French Championship : 1992, 1995 and 1996 (Saint-Estève).
Runner-up at the  Lord Derby Cup :1988 and 1990 (Saint-Estève).

Coach 

 Team honours :
 Winner of the French Championship : 1998 (Saint-Estève).
Winner of the Lord Derby Cup : 1998 (Saint-Estève).

References

1964 births
Living people
French rugby league players
France national rugby league team players
Rugby league hookers